Herbert Morley (2 April 1616 – 29 September 1667) was an English politician who sat in the House of Commons  variously between 1640 and 1667. He fought for the Parliamentary army in the English Civil War. Later he was appointed Lieutenant of the Tower of London.

Morley was the son of Robert Morley of Glynde Place, Sussex and his wife Susanna Hodgson, daughter and heiress of Thomas Hodgson, of Framfield. He was at school at Lewes and was admitted at Emmanuel College, Cambridge on 9 May 1632. He was admitted at the Inner Temple in November 1634.

He served as a Justice of the Peace for Sussex from 1641 to 1660.

Morley was elected Member of Parliament for Lewes just before the dissolution of the Short Parliament. In November 1640, he was re- elected MP for Lewes in the Long Parliament. In the civil war he became a colonel in the Parliamentary Army and was chief agent for raising troops, and sequestrating estates, in Sussex. Morley was the leader of the Parliamentarian army at the Battle of Muster Green, fought on the first week of December 1642 on Muster Green in Haywards Heath in Sussex, and won the battle. He was nominated one of the King's judges, but refused to act. He was a member of the Council of State between 1650 and 1653. In 1654 he was returned as MP for Sussex and for Rye in the First Protectorate Parliament.  In 1656 he was elected as MP for Sussex in the Second Protectorate Parliament. In 1659 he was elected MP for Sussex and for Lewes in the Third Protectorate Parliament. He was member of the Council of State and an Admiralty Commissioner in 1659

In 1660, Morley was a member of the Council of State and was elected MP for Rye in the Convention Parliament.  He refused to negotiate the King's return and purchased a pardon in 1660. He was re-elected MP for Rye in 1661 for the Cavalier Parliament and sat until his death in 1667. 
 
Morley died at the age of 51.

References

 

 

Lieutenants of the Tower of London
1616 births
1667 deaths
English MPs 1661–1679
Roundheads
High Sheriffs of Surrey
High Sheriffs of Sussex
Sussex Militia officers
English MPs 1640 (April)
English MPs 1640–1648
English MPs 1654–1655
English MPs 1656–1658
English MPs 1659
English MPs 1660